Fayad or Fayadh (in Arabic: فياض) may be a given name or surname. 

Notable people with the name include:

Given name 

Fayad Mahmoud Hissain, Bahraini footballer
Fayad Jamís (1930–1988), Cuban poet, painter, designer, journalist and translator

Surname: Fayad 

Ali Fayad (disambiguation), multiple people
Álvaro Fayad aka "The Turk" (1946–1986), Colombian guerrilla, co-founder and leader of the 19th of April movement (M-19)
Ibrahim Fayad (1931–2008), Egyptian pediatrician
José Antonio Gali Fayad (born 1959), Mexican politician 
Mahmoud Fayad (1925–2002), Egyptian featherweight weightlifter and Olympian
Mohamed Fayad, Egyptian-American professor of Computer Engineering
Omar Fayad (born 1962), Mexican politician
Said Fayad (1921–2003), Lebanese poet and literary journalist
Victor Fayad (1955–2014), Argentine politician and lawyer

Surname: Fayadh 

Ashraf Fayadh (born 1980), Palestinian artist and poet
Shafiq Fayadh (1937–2015), Syrian military commander and close adviser to President Hafez al-Assad

See also
Fayyad (disambiguation)